Events from the year 1813 in Canada.

Incumbents
Monarch: George III

Federal government
Parliament of Lower Canada: 7th 
Parliament of Upper Canada: 6th

Governors
Governor of the Canadas: Robert Milnes
Governor of New Brunswick: George Prévost
Governor of Nova Scotia: John Coape Sherbrooke
Commodore-Governor of Newfoundland: Richard Goodwin Keats
Governor of Prince Edward Island: Joseph Frederick Wallet DesBarres then Charles Douglass Smith

Events
 January 22 – General Henry Proctor's 1,300 British and natives capture 495 U.S. troops, under General Winchester.
 February 7 – Raid on Elizabethtown.
 March 30 – Engagement at Lacolle.
 April 27 – Battle of York: The Americans, under Henry Dearborn, take York, but the explosion of a magazine kills many of them. Americans burn York.
 May 5 – Battle of Fort George.
 June 1 – The English frigate "Shannon" takes the "Chesapeake," in 15 minutes, off Boston.
 June 3 – The "Growler" and the "Eagle," which left Plattsburg, yesterday, are taken by the British gun-boats they pursued
 June 6 – Capture of Generals Chandler and Winder and 120 U.S. troops, at Stoney Creek, by Sgt. Alexander Fraser. The Battle of Stoney Creek is a Canadian victory.
 June 23 or June 24 – Battle of Beaver Dams is a Canadian victory, in part due to Laura Secord's famous 32 km. walk to warn Lieutenant James Fitzgibbon, who had already been warned by Natives. 
 July 30 – The British destroy Plattsburg's barracks, and fire at Burlington, but avoid the reply.
 September 10 – The Battle of Put-in-Bay, Lake Erie is an American victory.
 October 5 – The Battle of Moraviantown, also known as the Battle of the Thames, is an American victory. British supporter and Shawnee Indian Chief Tecumseh is killed. 
 October 25 – The Battle of Chateauguay, with mostly French-Canadian soldiers is a Canadian victory over larger numbers of American troops.
 October 26 – General Hampton, commanding 7,000 U.S. troops, ignorant of Col. Charles de Salaberry's experience, and expecting French desertions, divides his force. Part lose their way; the rest spend their strength in a maze of obstructions. De Salaberry gains the thanks of the commander-in-chief and of both Houses, and decoration by then prince regent George IV .
 November 11 – The Battle of Crysler's Farm, with English-Canadian soldiers, is a Canadian victory over larger American troops.
 December 19 – Col. Murray takes Fort Niagara.
 Quebec City has a shipping year involving 198 vessels, of 46,514 tons.
 Angus Bethune witnessed the North West Company's purchase of Fort Astoria from the Pacific Fur Company.

Births
March 5 – Casimir Gzowski, engineer (d.1898)
June 5 – François Bourassa, farmer and politician (d.1898)
August 4 – George Luther Hathaway, 3rd Premier of New Brunswick (d.1872)  
August 7 – John Ostell, architect, surveyor and manufacturer (d.1892)
September 30 – John Rae, doctor and explorer (d.1893)

Full date unknown
James Austin, businessman (d.1897)

Deaths
February 5 – William Berczy, painter, architect, author, and colonizer (b.1744) 
April 27 – Zebulon Pike, American-born general and explorer (b.1779)
October 5 – Tecumseh (b.c1768)
November 26 – John Craigie, businessman and political figure (b.c1757)
December 19 – James McGill, merchant, philanthropist (b.1744)

References

 
Canada
Years of the 19th century in Canada
1813 in North America